Björn Berg (born January 24, 1972 in Umeå) is a beach volleyball player from Sweden, who competed in two consecutive Summer Olympics for his native country, starting in 2000. In both tournaments he teamed up with Simon Dahl.

Playing Partners
Simon Dahl
Hannes Brinkborg
Robert Svensson 
Emil Norberg 
Tom Englen

References

External links
 
 
 
 

1972 births
Living people
Beach volleyball players at the 2000 Summer Olympics
Beach volleyball players at the 2004 Summer Olympics
Swedish beach volleyball players
Olympic beach volleyball players of Sweden
Sportspeople from Umeå